The BBC Sessions 1971–1973 is a live album by English folk rock singer Sandy Denny released in 1997. It contains a selection of live concert tracks recorded at the Paris Theatre, London on 16 March 1972, as well as live studio tracks recorded for the BBC.

The CD was withdrawn on the day of release due to a legal dispute with Island Records but 3,500 copies were already in the shops and were allowed to remain in circulation. For many years this was a highly desirable collectable amongst fans until 2007 when the expanded Live at the BBC box set superseded this album.

Track listing
All tracks credited to Sandy Denny unless otherwise stated
 "The North Star Grassman and the Ravens" – 3:47 
 "Sweet Rosemary" – 3:15 
 "The Lady" – 3:45 
 "Next Time Around" – 4:46 
 "Blackwaterside" (Traditional) – 3:26 
 "John the Gun" – 3:13 
 "Late November" – 5:08 
 "The Optimist" – 3:27 
 "Crazy Lady Blues" – 2:17 
 "The Lowlands of Holland" (Traditional) – 3:09 
 "It Suits Me Well" – 4:13 
 "Bushes and Briars" – 2:35 
 "The Music Weaver" – 3:08 
 "It’ll Take a Long Time" – 4:02 
 "Who Knows Where the Time Goes?" – 5:35 
 "Until the Real Thing Comes Along" (L.E. Freeman, Sammy Cahn, Saul Chaplin) – 4:05 
 "Whispering Grass" (Doris Fisher, Fred Fisher) – 3:27 
 "Like an Old Fashioned Waltz" – 3:31 
 "Dark the Night" – 4:07 
 "Solo" – 4:28

Personnel
 Sandy Denny - vocals, piano, guitar
Tracks 16-17 and 19-20 with the addition of
 Hughie Burns - guitar
 Pat Donaldson - bass
 Willie Murray - drums

Production credits
 Tracks 1-6 and 11-14 produced by Jeff Griffin
 Tracks 7-10 engineered by John White and Nick Gomin, produced by John Muir
 Tracks 15-20 produced by Tony Wilson

References

Sandy Denny: BBC Sessions
The BBC Sessions 1971-73: Sandy Denny Official

Sandy Denny albums
1997 live albums
BBC Radio recordings